Mark McGurl is an American literary critic specializing in 20th-century American literature.  He is the Albert L. Guérard Professor of Literature at Stanford University.

Background
McGurl received his B.A. from Harvard University and Ph.D. in Comparative Literature from  Johns Hopkins University. He has also worked as a journalist for The New York Times and The New York Review of Books. In 2011, McGurl received the Truman Capote Award for Literary Criticism for The Program Era: Postwar Fiction and the Rise of Creative Writing.

Publications

Books
The Novel Art: Elevations of American Fiction after Henry James (Princeton University Press, 2001)
The Program Era: Postwar Fiction and the Rise of Creative Writing (Harvard University Press, 2009)
Everything & Less: The Novel in the Age of Amazon (Verso Books, 2021)

Articles and essays
"Ordinary Doom: Literary Studies in the Waste Land of the Present,"New Literary History," Fall 2010
"A Response to Elif Batuman's Review of The Program Era in the London Review of Books" Official Website: The Program Era Reviews, October 1/October 10, 2010
"The Zombie Renaissance," n+1 no.9 spring 2010
"Understanding Iowa: Flannery O'Connor B.A., M.F.A." American Literary History, Summer 2007
"Learning from Little Tree: The Political Education of the Counterculture" Yale Journal of Criticism, Fall 2005
"The Program Era: Pluralisms of Postwar American Fiction" Critical Inquiry, Fall 2005
"Social Geometries: Taking Place in Henry James" Representations  68, Autumn 1999, 59-83
"Making 'Literature' of It:Hammett and High Culture" American Literary History, 9.4, Winter 1997, 702-717
"Making It Big: Picturing the Radio Age in King Kong" Critical Inquiry, Spring 1996

Notes

External links
 Official Website

American literary critics
Literary critics of English
University of California, Los Angeles faculty
Harvard University alumni
Johns Hopkins University alumni
Living people
Year of birth missing (living people)
Stanford University Department of English faculty